The 1984 Marshall Thundering Herd football team was an American football team that represented Marshall University in the Southern Conference (SoCon) during the 1984 NCAA Division I-AA football season. In its first season under head coach Stan Parrish, the team compiled a 6–5 record (2–4 against conference opponents) and played its home games at Fairfield Stadium in Huntington, West Virginia. It marked the Thundering Herd's first winning season since 1964.

Schedule

References

Marshall
Marshall Thundering Herd football seasons
Marshall Thundering Herd football